Hermann Branz (26 January 1920 – 28 November 2004) was a German philatelist who was added to the Roll of Distinguished Philatelists in 1982.

Branz was awarded the Lindenberg Medal in 1986.

References

Signatories to the Roll of Distinguished Philatelists
1920 births
2004 deaths
German philatelists